Hammaptera parinotata is a species of geometrid moth in the family Geometridae.

The MONA or Hodges number for Hammaptera parinotata is 7314.

References

Further reading

 
 

Hydriomenini
Articles created by Qbugbot
Moths described in 1872